Deniz may refer to:

 Deniz (given name), Turkish given name 
 Deniz (surname), surname both of Spanish-Portuguese and Turkish origins
 Denizköy (disambiguation), one of a number of villages in Turkey